Kristina Šmigun-Vähi (born 23 February 1977) is a former Estonian female cross-country skier and politician. She is the most successful Estonian female cross-country skier with two Olympic gold medals. In 2019 she was elected as a Member of the Estonian Parliament.

Career
On 12 February 2006, she won the Winter Olympics gold medal for the 7.5 km + 7.5 km double pursuit, becoming the first Estonian woman to win a medal at the Winter Olympics. Four days later, she won a second gold medal in the 10 km classical.

On 15 February 2010, she won her third Olympic medal, a silver in the 10 km freestyle race.  With two golds and one silver, Šmigun-Vähi is the most successful Estonian athlete in Olympic history (summer or winter), tying the record of men's cross-country skier Andrus Veerpalu.

Šmigun-Vähi has also found success at the FIS Nordic World Ski Championships, earning six medals. This included one gold (2003: 5 km + 5 km double pursuit), three silvers (1999: 15 km, 2003: 10 km, 15 km), and two bronzes (1999, 2003: both in 30 km).

On 2 July 2010, Šmigun-Vähi announced that she will quit her professional sport career to focus on her family and her daughter Victoria-Kris. On 24 October 2016, the World Anti-Doping Agency Athletes' Commission stated that Šmigun-Vähi faced a Court of Arbitration for Sport hearing before the end of October.

Personal life
She is the daughter of former cross-country skiers Rutt and Anatoli Šmigun. Her sister Katrin Šmigun and cousin Aivar Rehemaa were also cross-country skiers.

Šmigun-Vähi is married to her long-time manager Kristjan-Thor Vähi, She missed the 2007–08 and 2008–09 seasons due to pregnancy. She has two children, daughter born in 2008 and son born in 2011.

Cross-country skiing results
All results are sourced from the International Ski Federation (FIS).

Olympic Games
 3 medals – (2 gold, 1 silver)

World Championships
 6 medals – (1 gold, 3 silver, 2 bronze)

a.  Cancelled due to extremely cold weather.

World Cup

Season titles
 2 titles – (1 long distance, 1 middle distance)

Season standings

Individual podiums

16 victories – (16 ) 
50 podiums – (49 , 1 ) 

Note:   Until the 1999 World Championships, World Championship and Olympic races were included in the World Cup scoring system.

Overall record

a.  Classification is made according to FIS classification.
b.  Includes individual and mass start races.
c.  Includes pursuit and double pursuit races.
d.  May be incomplete due to lack of appropriate sources for some relay races prior to 1995/96 World Cup season.

Note: Until 1999 World Championships and 1994 Olympics, World Championship and Olympic races were part of the World Cup. Hence results from those races are included in the World Cup overall record.

See also
List of multiple Olympic gold medalists at a single Games

References

External links 
 

1977 births
21st-century Estonian women politicians
Cross-country skiers at the 1994 Winter Olympics
Cross-country skiers at the 1998 Winter Olympics
Cross-country skiers at the 2002 Winter Olympics
Cross-country skiers at the 2006 Winter Olympics
Cross-country skiers at the 2010 Winter Olympics
Estonian female cross-country skiers
Estonian Reform Party politicians
Estonian sportsperson-politicians
FIS Nordic World Ski Championships medalists in cross-country skiing
Living people
Medalists at the 2006 Winter Olympics
Medalists at the 2010 Winter Olympics
Members of the Riigikogu, 2019–2023
Members of the Riigikogu, 2023–2027
Olympic cross-country skiers of Estonia
Olympic gold medalists for Estonia
Olympic medalists in cross-country skiing
Olympic silver medalists for Estonia
Politicians from Tartu
Recipients of the Order of the White Star, 1st Class
Sportspeople from Tartu
Women members of the Riigikogu